Miss France 1997, the 67th edition of the Miss France pageant, was held on December 13, 1996 at the Futuroscope in Vienne.

It was the first time that the pageant took place at the Futuroscope Congress Palace. Contestants traveled to Saint-Barthelemy for two weeks in November, and they repeated at the Futuroscope two weeks before the pageant and the final competition on December 13, 1996. 

The event, held at the Futuroscope Congress Palace was broadcast live on TF1, with more than ten million viewers. 

The president of the judging panel was the beautiful Frenchwoman Christiane Martel Aleman, who had been Miss Cinémonde 1953 and Miss Universe 1953, as well as a leading actress in Mexico in the 1960s.

The winner was Patricia Spehar of Paris was crowned Miss France 1997 by the outgoing title-holder Laure Belleville of Pays de Savoie, Miss France 1996. She has represented France at Miss Universe 1997 but unplaced. She also placed in top 15 at Miss International 1998. The first runner up, Marie Borg, has finished 1st runner-up at Miss International 1997.

Results

Contestants
The 44 Miss France 1997 contestants were:

 Albigeois - Elsa Mazzia
 - Lara Maringer
 Anjou - Sandrine Hamidi
 - Maylis Ondicola
 Artois-Côte d'Opale - Virginie Tellier
 - Catherine Sarret
 Béarn - Anne-Sophie Vigno
 Berry - Barbara Niewidtzala
 - Severine Andre
 - Stéphanie Sevat
 - Carole Roudeillac
 Camargue - Sandrine Montagud
 - Nathalie Frère
 Charentes Poitou - Nancy Bourgeix
 Comminges - Carine Vincent
 - Delphine Cheuva
 Flandre - Sarah Sumfleth
 - Delphine Pequignet
 - Sabine Alves de Puga
 - Patricia Sellin
 Hainaut - Caroline Lubrez
 Île-de-France - Audrey Legros
 - Carole Pages
 - Stéphanie Leroy
 - Manuela Pereira
 - Angélique Sage
 Maine - Angélique Monnier
 - Marianne Samson
 - Mélanie Muller
 - Patricia Spehar
 Pays d'Ain - Carine Boirot
 - Céline Bourban
 Pays de Savoie - Séverine Martin
 Pays du Velay - Amélie Fournel
 Périgord - Caren Claret
 - Magalie Lherminier
 - Pascale Delzenne
 Quercy - Delphine Verdié
 - Fabienne Sabrimoutou
 - Delphine Brossard
 Rouergue-Cévennes - Aurore Pecrix
 St-Étienne-Loire - Christelle Arcis
 Toulouse Midi-Pyrénées - Marie Borg
 Touraine-Soulogne - Murielle Hoarau

Ranking

First round 
Order of announcement of the 12 semifinalists:

Second round 
Order of announcement of the 5 finalists:

Judges

Notes about the placements 
Paris wins for the thirteenth time in the Miss France pageant after eleven years drought.
Guadeloupe is placed for third consecutive year.
Anjou, Charentes Poitou, Hainaut and Provence are placed for second consecutive year.
Auvergne is placed for the first time since the Miss France 1991 pageant.
Aquitaine, Berry, Paris et Toulouse are placed for the first time since the Miss France 1995 pageant.
Béarn et Rhône-Alpes are placed for the first time.

Crossovers 
Contestants who previously competed or will be competing at international beauty pageants:

Miss Universe
1997:  Paris - Patricia Spehar
 (Miami Beach)

Miss International
1997:  Toulouse - Marie Borg (2nd Runner-up)
 (Kyoto)
1998:  Paris - Patricia Spehar (Top 15)
 (Tokyo)

References

External links

1996 beauty pageants
1996 in France
Miss France
Poitiers
December 1996 events in Europe